Brian Murphy (born 1973) is an Irish retired Gaelic footballer. His league and championship career with the Cork senior team lasted from 1993 until 1997.

Born in Clonakilty, County Cork, Murphy first played for the Clonakilty club at juvenile and underage levels. In 1996 he was club captain when the team won the county senior championship.

Murphy made his debut on the inter-county scene at the age of seventeen when he was selected for the Cork minor team. He enjoyed one championship season with the minor team, culminating with the winning of an All-Ireland medal in 1991. Murphy subsequently joined the Cork under-21, winning an All-Ireland medal in 1994. By this stage he had joined the Cork senior team after making his debut during the 1993 championship. An All-Ireland runner-up in his debut season, Murphy won three Munster medals.

Honours

Clonakilty
 Cork Senior Football Championship (1): 1996 (c)

Cork
 Munster Senior Football Championship (3): 1993, 1994, 1995
 All-Ireland Under-21 Football Championship (1): 1994
 Munster Under-21 Football Championship (1): 1994
 All-Ireland Minor Football Championship (1): 1991
 Munster Minor Football Championship (1): 1991

References

1973 births
Living people
Clonakilty Gaelic footballers
Cork inter-county Gaelic footballers